Efraim Tendero, born in the Philippines, is an Evangelical leader, an ambassador of the World Evangelical Alliance, former Secretary-General of World Evangelical Alliance. Prior to this position, he was National Director of the Philippine Council of Evangelical Churches for 22 years. He was also executive director of the Philippine Relief and Development Services (PHILRADS) and executive editor of the periodical "Evangelicals Today".

Biography 
Tendero was born in Philippines. He studied evangelical theology at FEBIAS College of Bible Valenzuela, Philippines where he obtained a Bachelor of Arts in 1978. He continued his studies in United States, at the Trinity Evangelical Divinity School in Deerfield, Illinois. He will get a Master's degree in theology with a focus on Pastoral Counseling.

Ministry

In 1993, Tendero appointed as national director of the Philippine Council of Evangelical Churches (PCEC), an alliance which includes 30,000 Evangelical churches. He held this position until February 23, 2015, for 22 years.

He was sworn February 21, 2015, for a term who officially began March 1, 2015. He was also executive director of the Philippine Relief and Development Services (PHILRADS and executive editor of the periodical "Evangelicals Today". In 2005, he was appointed member of the Philippine Consultative Commission which was tasked to review and propose amendments to the 1987 constitution. He was a mediator for 5 years in iraq in the peace process with the rebels of Moro Islamic Liberation Front. On January 24, 2015, he was elected Secretary-General of World Evangelical Alliance for a period of 5 years. He ended his mandate in 2021 and became an ambassador of the World Evangelical Alliance, a spokesperson function.

Awards  
He received three Honorary degree of the Asian Theological Seminary, the FEBIAS College of Bible, and the International School of Theology-Asia.

Personal life
Tendero is married to Sierry Soriano. They have four children; Elizabeth Esther, Efraim Elijah, Ezra Emmanuel and Elah Eunice.

References

Content in this edit is translated from the existing French Wikipedia article at :fr: Efraim Tendero; see its history for attribution.

Filipino Christian religious leaders
Year of birth missing (living people)
Living people
Place of birth missing (living people)
Filipino evangelicals
Recipients of the Presidential Medal of Merit (Philippines)